Carabus akinini ketmenensis is a black or brown-coloured subspecies of ground beetle from family Carabidae, that is endemic to Kazakhstan.

References

akinini ketmenensis
Beetles described in 1991
Endemic fauna of Kazakhstan